NGC 708 is an elliptical galaxy located 240 million light-years away in the constellation Andromeda and was discovered by astronomer William Herschel on September 21, 1786. It is classified as a cD galaxy and is the brightest member of Abell 262. NGC 708 is a weak FR I radio galaxy and is also classified as a type 2 Seyfert galaxy.

NGC 708 is surrounded by 4,700 globular clusters.

Dust lane
Discovered in 1979 by Kotanyi et al., NGC 708 has a thin dust lane with an irregular structure. Besides the dust lane, there are also patches of dust that cross the nucleus. These features are oriented nearly perpendicular to the radio emission of the galaxy.

The dust lane appears to have formed from a cooling accretion flow of intracluster medium (ICM) onto NGC 708.

Supermassive black hole
NGC 708 has a supermassive black hole with an estimated mass of ( M☉) (108.46) .

The supermassive black hole is powering the radio jets and lobes in the galaxy.

Radio morphology

Chandra observations have shown that the lobes have created a cavity in the intracluster medium of Abell 262.

Possible interaction

See also
 List of NGC objects (1–1000)
 Messier 87
 NGC 1275

References

External links

708
6962
Andromeda (constellation)
Astronomical objects discovered in 1786
Elliptical galaxies
Abell 262
1348
Seyfert galaxies
Radio galaxies
Discoveries by William Herschel